Canadian bacon is the American name for a form of back bacon that is cured, smoked and fully cooked, trimmed into cylindrical medallions, and thickly sliced.

Canadian bacon may also refer to:

 Canadian Bacon, a 1995 comedy film
 Canadian Bacon (mountain), a mountain in the U.S. state of Washington